This is a list of cities, towns, and villages in Slovenia, starting with T.

Lists of populated places in Slovenia